Muana Mboka is a 1999 short animated film.

Synopsis
Muana Mboka is a street boy like so many others in the big cities of Africa. Like most, he survives through larceny, occasional jobs, and prostitution. Muana Mboka saves the life of a minister who was stuck in a traffic jam. The reward received and the rumors going around create hatred and envy. Suddenly, the entire city is thrown into utter darkness. This sudden event has a beneficial effect on Muana's family members.

External links

1999 films
Democratic Republic of the Congo short films
Creative Commons-licensed films